is a 1990 strategy video game by Wolf Team. Set in Feudal Japan, it follows yaksha warriors fighting against demons. Units must be deployed for both protection and attack.

References

1990 video games
Japan-exclusive video games
Sega Genesis games
Video games set in feudal Japan
NEC PC-8801 games
NEC PC-9801 games
Video games scored by Motoi Sakuraba
Video games developed in Japan